Events in the year 1833 in Belgium.

Incumbents
Monarch: Leopold I
Prime Minister: Albert Joseph Goblet d'Alviella

Events

23 January – Treaty of amity and navigation with the United States signed but never ratified.
23 February – Grand Orient of Belgium established, with Goswin de Stassart as first Grand Master
21 May – Convention of London indefinitely extends ceasefire with the Kingdom of the Netherlands following the Belgian Revolution of 1830
23 May – 1833 Belgian general election
16 June – Jean Arnold Barrett consecrated as Bishop of Namur
18 July – Law on distilleries passed, establishing a duty of 22 centimes per hectolitre per day on distillation containers used.
8 September – First Daughters of the Cross make their vows (founder Marie Thérèse Haze).
 October – Opening of Sint-Barbaracollege, re-established Jesuit college in Ghent.
8 October – Belgian Iron Cross established to honour bravery during the Belgian Revolution
18 November – Treaty of Zonhoven between Belgium and the Netherlands, regulating navigation on the Meuse River

Publications
 Almanach de poche de Bruxelles (Brussels, M.-E. Rampelbergh)
 Almanach de la Province de la Flandre Orientale (Ghent, Vanderhaeghe-Maya)
 Pasinomie, ou Collection complète des lois, décrets, arrêtés et règlemens généraux qui peuvent être invoqués en Belgique, vol. 1.

Births

 7 February – Eugène Anspach, governor of the national bank (died 1890)
 18 March – José Dupuis, performer (died 1900)
 6 April – Charles De Smedt, Church historian (died 1911)
 24 July – Louis-Philippe, Crown Prince of Belgium (died 1834)
 4 November – Théophile de Lantsheere, politician (died 1918)

Deaths
 20 February – Jean-Baptiste de Bouge (born 1757), cartographer
 12 May – Philippe-Auguste Hennequin (born 1762), artist
 26 September – Auguste Marie Raymond d'Arenberg (born 1753), aristocrat

References